Timothy Stevens (born 26 March 1989 in Sint-Truiden) is a Belgian cyclist, who currently rides for Belgian amateur team ODB Cycling Team.

Major results

2010
 9th Dwars door het Hageland
2012
 1st Dwars door het Hageland
 9th Grote Prijs Stad Geel
2013
 9th Gooikse Pijl
2014
 6th Dorpenomloop Rucphen
2015
 3rd Memorial Van Coningsloo
 9th Ronde van Overijssel
 9th Kernen Omloop Echt-Susteren
2016
 2nd Grand Prix Criquielion
 3rd Ronde van Overijssel
 5th Nationale Sluitingsprijs
2017
 1st Arno Wallaard Memorial
 3rd Duo Normand (with David Boucher)
 10th Grote Prijs Jean-Pierre Monseré
2018
 1st De Kustpijl
2019
 5th Grand Prix de la ville de Pérenchies

References

External links

1989 births
Living people
Belgian male cyclists
People from Sint-Truiden
Cyclists from Limburg (Belgium)